Navarasa Thilagam is a 2016 Indian Tamil-language comedy film directed by Kamran, starring Ma Ka Pa Anand and Srushti Dange. Produced by Sudharshan Vembatty, the film began production in early 2015 and released in February 2016.

Cast

Ma Ka Pa Anand as Moorthy
Srushti Dange as Chithra
Karunakaran as Alangaram
Meera Krishnan as Chithra's mother
Ilavarasu as Paneerselvam
Jayaprakash as Thangadurai
Mahadevan as Adaikalam
Namo Narayana as Namo Narayana
Siddharth Vipin as Thirunavukkarasu
Revathi as Chithra's grandmother
Amirtha Lingam as Alangaram's uncle
Cheran Raj as Politician
Porali Dileepan as Arul Prasath
Lakshmi Rahul as Meenakshi
 Bava Lakshmanan
Hello Kandhasamy
Anjali Varadarajan

Production
Ma Ka Pa Anand shot for the film simultaneously alongside his commitments for Panjumittai, Atti and Deepavali Thuppakki. The film was predominantly shot in Pollachi and was completed by September 2015. Songs were also shot in Kutralam and Thenkasi. The lead pair refused to shoot a kissing scene in the film, and stated that the director failed to disclose the shot in the original narration of the script.

Soundtrack
The soundtrack was composed by Siddharth Vipin.

"Ayyayyo Vasama" - Karthik, Sunitha Sarathy
"Oru Kattu" - Jagadish, Vishnupriya
"Dummy Davali" - Jagadish, Naresh Iyer
"Kolla Azhagukari" - Anthony Daasan
"Angaliya" - Anthony Daasan

Reception
Times of India wrote "Navarasa Thilagam is a film that thinks of itself as a comedy while not making an effort to be one. The writing is quite bland (there is zero effort in building up the central romantic track) and the narrative predictable (we even get a hapless 'foreign mapillai'), and it is left to the cast to shore up the film." Indiaglitz wrote "Navarasa Thilagam is a "Kalavani" kind of film which is not as entertaining but a watchable film that engages the viewer in most parts." New Indian Express wrote "The screenplay is more verbal in its take. The script may have seemed good on paper, but on the screen it falls flat. If only it had some punch and was crafted more interestingly [..] Navarasa Thilagam is, at most, a promising effort from a debutant maker." Sify wrote "Overall, Navarasa Thilagam is a damp squib and the joke is only on us!."

References

External links
 

2016 films
2010s Tamil-language films
Films scored by Siddharth Vipin
Indian comedy films
2016 comedy films
Films shot in Pollachi
2016 directorial debut films